Jani Forsström (born February 19, 1986)is a Finnish professional ice hockey defenceman who currently plays for TPS of the Liiga.

Forsström previously played in Liiga for Pelicans and HPK. He also played in Serie A for HC Alleghe.

References

External links

1986 births
Living people
HC Alleghe players
Finnish ice hockey defencemen
HPK players
Lahti Pelicans players
Mikkelin Jukurit players
Sportspeople from Lahti
Tingsryds AIF players
HC TPS players